William Gibbs ( – 7 November 1896) was a 19th-century Member of Parliament from the Nelson Region of New Zealand.

Gibbs migrated to New Zealand in 1851 and purchased a large block of land at Tōtaranui. Much of this land is now incorporated into the Abel Tasman National Park. He completed a large homestead there for his wife and eight children, where they lived until moving to Nelson in 1892 when Gibbs retired.

His daughter Hannah Sarah Gibbs married Alexander Mackay at Collingwood in 1863.

The town of Collingwood was originally called Gibbstown after Gibbs.

Gibbs died aged 76 at his home in Nelson on 7 November 1896, and was buried at Wakapuaka Cemetery.

References

Members of the New Zealand House of Representatives
1820 births
1896 deaths
Unsuccessful candidates in the 1881 New Zealand general election
New Zealand MPs for South Island electorates
Burials at Wakapuaka Cemetery
19th-century New Zealand politicians